Mirosław Małek (born 9 March 1975) is a Polish windsurfer. He competed in the men's Mistral One Design event at the 1996 Summer Olympics.

References

1975 births
Living people
Polish male sailors (sport)
Polish windsurfers
Olympic sailors of Poland
Sailors at the 1996 Summer Olympics – Mistral One Design
People from Rybnik
Sportspeople from Silesian Voivodeship